Johan van Schreven (17 September 1874 – 10 November 1924) was a Dutch fencer. He competed in the individual épée and sabre events at the 1908 Summer Olympics.

References

1874 births
1924 deaths
Dutch male fencers
Olympic fencers of the Netherlands
Fencers at the 1908 Summer Olympics
People from Batavia, Dutch East Indies